Louise Dunn Aitken-Walker MBE (born January 1960 in Duns, Berwickshire) is a British rally and saloon car racing driver. Aitken-Walker entered competition in 1979 and finished 19th in her first Rally GB two years later. She contested the 1989 British Touring Car Championship in a Class C Vauxhall Astra finishing fifth in points, and in 1990 was the first ever Ladies World Champion, the pinnacle of a successful 14-year career. She was awarded the Segrave Trophy in 1990. She retired in 1993 to have a family (son John and daughter Gina) and concentrate on her business affairs. She runs Aitken-Walker Cars, which specializes in quality used cars, with her husband Graham in the Scottish Borders.

In September 2008, Aitken-Walker took part in the Colin McRae Forest Stages Rally, a round of the Scottish Rally Championship centred in Perth in Scotland. A historic Talbot Sunbeam Lotus was her chosen car for the event. She was one of a number of ex-world and British champions to take part in the event in memory of McRae, who died in 2007.

Aitken-Walker was inducted into the Scottish Sports Hall of Fame in 2002.

Racing record

Complete WRC results

Complete British Touring Car Championship results
(key) (Races in bold indicate pole position in class) (Races in italics indicate fastest lap in class - 1 point awarded all races)

See also
List of female World Rally Championship drivers

References

External links
Rally experience sessions with Aitken-Walker
 Family-run business with her husband, Son & Daughter
 Louises Daughter Gina has started her career, supported by her mum

Female rally drivers
Scottish Rally Championship
Scottish rally drivers
1960 births
Living people
Segrave Trophy recipients
British Touring Car Championship drivers
Members of the Order of the British Empire
People from Duns, Scottish Borders
World Rally Championship drivers
Scottish female racing drivers

Nismo drivers